Lauren Moyer (born May 13, 1995) is an American field hockey player for the American national team. Moyer was raised to the United States national team in 2017, following success in the national junior team.

Career

College

Attended the University of North Carolina at Chapel Hill from 2013 - 2017. The Tar Heels won 1 ACC Championship title in 2015 At UNC, Named to the All-ACC First Team, All-ACC Tournament Team, NCAA Division I All-Tournament Team, Longstreth/NFHCA All-South Region First Team, Named a Longstreth/NFHCA All-American.

Junior Women's National Team

Moyer first appearance on a Junior National Team occurred in 2012 when she was named to the U-19 Women National Team. Then in 2014 was named to the U.S. U-21 Women's National Team under Janneke Schopman

Major tournament appearances:

Silver - 2016 Women's Pan American Junior Championship(Trinidad & Tobago)

8th - 2016 Women's FIH Hockey Junior World Cup (Santiago, Chile)

Senior Women's National Team

Named to the squad in 2017, Moyer earned her first senior cap vs Ireland May 24 in a friendly series in Lancaster, Pennsylvania. Major tournaments played in since 2017:

2020 Women's FIH Pro League (International competition)

Gold - 2017 World League Semifinals (Johannesburg, South Africa)

Bronze - 2019 Pan American Games (Lima, Peru)

Bronze - 2017 Pan American Cup (Lancaster, Pa.)

7th - 2017 World League Final (Auckland, New Zealand)

9th - 2019 Women's FIH Pro League (worldwide)

14th - 2018 Women's Hockey World Cup (London, England)

2019 FIH Hockey Olympic Qualifier (Bhubaneswar, India)

References

1995 births
Living people
American female field hockey players
Female field hockey midfielders
Sportspeople from York, Pennsylvania
Pan American Games bronze medalists for the United States
Pan American Games medalists in field hockey
Field hockey players at the 2019 Pan American Games
Medalists at the 2019 Pan American Games
21st-century American women